Elections to Trafford Council were held on 4 May 2006. One third of the council was up for election, with each successful candidate to serve a four-year term of office, expiring in 2010. The Conservative Party retained overall control of the council.

After the election, the composition of the council was as follows:

Summary

Ward results

References
Details Official Trafford Council Election page

2006 English local elections
2006
2000s in Greater Manchester